Private Angelo is a 1949 British comedy war film directed by Michael Anderson and Peter Ustinov and starring Ustinov, Godfrey Tearle, María Denis and Marjorie Rhodes. It depicts the misadventures of a soldier in the Italian Army during the Second World War. It was adapted from the 1946 novel Private Angelo by Eric Linklater. The film's costumes were designed by Ustinov's mother Nadia Benois.

A number of scenes were filmed in the Italian village of Trequanda in the Province of Siena. It also featured music played by the Società Filarmonica di Trequanda. Interiors were shot at Welwyn Studios, with sets designed by the art director John Howell.

Cast
 Peter Ustinov as Private Angelo
 Godfrey Tearle as Count Piccologrando
 María Denis as Lucrezia
 Marjorie Rhodes as Countess
 James Robertson Justice as Feste
 Moyna Macgill as Marchesa Dolce
 Robin Bailey as Simon Telfer
 Harry Locke as Corporal Trivet
 Bill Shine as Colonel Michael
 John Harvey as Corporal McCunn
 Diana Graves as Lucia

References

Bibliography
 Nicol, Christopher (2012) "Eric Linklater's Private Angelo and The Dark of Summer". Glasgow: ASLS

External links

1949 films
1949 comedy films
British black-and-white films
British comedy films
British war films
Films based on British novels
Films directed by Michael Anderson
Films directed by Peter Ustinov
Films shot in Tuscany
British World War II films
Films shot at Welwyn Studios
1949 directorial debut films
1940s English-language films
1940s British films